The Newman Lakers are a 3v3 basketball team based out of Newman Lake, Washington. They are currently coached by Team Captain Hayden Stevens. Other members of the team include: Kenny Martinez, (James) Winston Scott, and Brenten Goodwater. The Newman Lakers currently have no Spokane Hoopfest championships as of 2017. The Newman Lakers are known for their ability to shoot 3 point shots.

On June 15, 2017, Coach/Owner/Captain Hayden Stevens made a bold & confident choice of holding the teams celebration for winning Hoopfest on June 23, 2017, one day before the actual tournament. Coach Stevens has come under fire by some other Teams for his overconfident ways.

Origins 
The Newman Lakers originally started in 2009 where they were unable to win a game in the Hoopfest tournament. After going on an indefinite hiatus the Newman Lakers announced their plans to play the Hoopfest Tournament for the first time in 8 years.

Roster 

*Also the Team Captain and Coach

Practice Facility 
The Newman Lakers currently practice at Pavilion Park in Liberty Lake, Washington

They often scrimmage local teams to prepare for Hoopfest or play 2v2 games. 
Basketball teams in Washington (state)

Fan base 
The Newman Lakers have generated a fan base composed mostly of local residents around Newman Lake. The attribute primarily contributing to their notoriety in the community is the tenacity the team exudes despite a reputation of being an underdog in the tournament.